"Wanita" is a song made popular by Al Jolson in 1923.  Written by Tin Pan Alley songwriters, Al Sherman and Sam Coslow, it was their first hit song.  The song is about a man who is love with a girl (Juanita) who only wants nothing to do with him so he wrote this song to win her back.

The song is alternatively titled "Juanita" or "Wanita (Wanna Eat, Wanna Eat)".

External links 
 Internet Archive's downloadable copy of Al Jolson's 1923 recording

American jazz songs
Songs written by Sam Coslow
Songs written by Al Sherman
Al Jolson songs